Inger-Lise Skarstein, née Haug (born 6 July 1937 in Oslo) is a Norwegian politician for the Conservative Party.

She was a minor ballot candidate for the Parliament of Norway in 1973, was elected from Hordaland in 1977, and then re-elected on two occasions in 1981 and 1985.

On the local level she was a deputy member of Bergen city council from 1971 to 1975. From 1975 to 1979 she was a member of Hordaland county council.

She was the first continuity announcer in the Norwegian Broadcasting Corporation, having worked in that role from 1959 to 1965.

Her husband was Jakob Skarstein.

References

1937 births
Living people
Members of the Storting
Politicians from Bergen
Conservative Party (Norway) politicians
Norwegian television presenters
NRK people
Women members of the Storting
20th-century Norwegian politicians
20th-century Norwegian women politicians
Norwegian women television presenters